Robert Tyler Wickens (born March 13, 1989) is a Canadian racing driver from Guelph, Ontario, driving in the Michelin Pilot Challenge for Bryan Herta Autosport. In 2009 he finished in second place in the FIA Formula Two Championship, and in 2010 he was runner-up in the GP3 Series. In his return to Formula Renault 3.5, where he competed in 2008, he won the 2011 season championship with Carlin Motorsport, with backing of Marussia. Wickens then left the series to race in the DTM for the HWA Team.

Wickens left DTM after the 2017 season and signed to drive for Schmidt Peterson Motorsports in the 2018 IndyCar Series, going on to claim pole position in his debut race at the 2018 St. Petersburg Grand Prix. His promising debut IndyCar season came to a premature end when a violent crash during the 500-mile race at Pocono left him a paraplegic. Wickens issued a further statement clarifying that he was hopeful to be able to walk again, due to his spinal cord being bruised rather than completely severed and that he had felt 'some feeling and movement' back in his legs although the nerves were not in a state to walk. Though a paraplegic as of late October 2018, he hoped to be able to walk on his own within two years of the accident.

Career

Karting 
Wickens started his karting career in 2001 with wins in the Junior Heavy Marigold Fall Classic and the Junior Lite Iron Man Enduro. He was three-time champion of the Sunoco Ron Fellows Karting Championship in 2002, 2003, and 2005 in various classes. He also won races in ASN Canadian National Formula Junior, SKUSA ProMoto Tour, BeaveRun, PA, 80cc Junior OKRA Grand National, and Junior Heavy Mosport Grand Prix.

Formula BMW 

In 2005, when he was sixteen years old, Wickens started his formula racing career. Thanks to Junior Scholarship from BMW, he participated in Formula BMW USA for Team Apex Racing USA. He scored five podiums including two wins, which brought him third place and best rookie's title. Also he competed in Formula BMW World Final, where he finished sixth.

He remained in the series in 2006 for the same team, but after few races switched to the EuroInternational, because he became a Red Bull Junior Team driver. The Canadian amassed three wins, seven podiums and won the championship. Besides repeat appearance in Formula BMW World Final, Wickens was guest driver at the Nürburgring Formula BMW ADAC round, which was a support race for the Formula One European Grand Prix. After three months he again appeared at Nürburg to competing in the Eurocup Formula Renault 2.0 for Motopark Academy.

Champ Car Atlantic 

In 2007 Wickens moved to the Champ Car Atlantic for Red Bull/Team Forsythe. He took one win and another three podiums and was third in season standings, yielding Raphael Matos and Franck Perera.

Formula Renault 3.5 Series 
After four races at the end of the 2007 season, Wickens moved up to the Formula Renault 3.5 Series for the 2008 season, with Carlin Motorsport. He claimed one win at Silverstone and finished season on the twelfth place with 55 points.

Formula 3 Euro Series 
Apart from involvement in the Formula Renault 3.5 Series, in 2008 Wickens competed in Formula 3 Euro Series with Signature-Plus, missing the Hockenheim, Mugello and Brands Hatch rounds. His best results came at the second, rainy races on the Norisring and Bugatti Circuit, where he won. Both times, due to insufficient distance covered, half points were awarded. He continued his participation in 2009, but switched to Kolles & Heinz Union and only competed in the Hockenheim and Dijon rounds, failing to score a point.

FIA Formula Two Championship 
Wickens was the only North American driver in the revamped FIA Formula Two Championship for the 2009 season, driving car number 12. Wickens dominated the opening race of the series, leading every lap from pole position to become the first driver since Philippe Streiff in September 1984 to win an international Formula Two race. He repeated that in race two, to lead the championship. However, those were his only two wins of the season, as he struggled with reliability later in the season. Despite five retirements, Wickens ended up as the runner-up in the championship, albeit 51 points behind runaway champion Andy Soucek.

In November 2009 Wickens revealed that he had held "off the record" talks with several Formula 1 teams, and believe that his chances of driving in Formula 1 were increased by the fact that he is the only potential rookie North American driver who currently holds a valid FIA superlicence.

In June 2011 it was announced that Wickens had been signed to the Virgin Racing team as a reserve driver but that he would continue to race in the GP3 series.

GP3 Series
In 2010 Wickens raced in the GP3 Series with Status Grand Prix. After getting third place in Barcelona qualifying, a good start and Nigel Melker retiring on the opening lap upped him to second place in the first race. In the second race he started from seventh place and made his way up to fourth, which allowed him to lead the driver's standings.

Formula Renault 3.5 Series

Wickens was crowned the champion of the series in 2011, after edging out teammate Jean-Éric Vergne at the final race.

DTM

On April 3, 2012, Mercedes announced the revival of the Mercedes-Benz Junior Team that has guided several notable drivers in their racing careers like Heinz-Harald Frentzen, Karl Wendlinger and Michael Schumacher. With that announcement came the news that Wickens, together with the Formula 3 Euro Series champion Roberto Merhi and DTM-sophomore Christian Vietoris, would become a part of the new Junior Team and that the three of them would drive for the Junior Team in the 2012 DTM season. In addition to that, 7-time F1 World Champion Michael Schumacher was involved with the three drivers by serving as a mentor. Wickens' entry into the DTM meant that he would be one of two Canadians in the drivers field, together with Bruno Spengler.

IndyCar

In June 2017, Wickens joined Schmidt Peterson Motorsports for the IndyCar Series' Kohler Grand Prix at Road America. He drove the no. 7 car during practice in place of Mikhail Aleshin, who had competed in the 24 Hours of Le Mans a week prior and was unable to return to the United States in time for the start of the Grand Prix weekend due to problems surrounding his immigration visa.

It was announced in October 2017 that Wickens would be joining the team full-time for the 2018 season.

He would go on to claim pole position in his debut qualifying session on March 10, 2018, for the 2018 Firestone Grand Prix of St. Petersburg. After Wickens led the race for all but the last two laps, Alexander Rossi made a move for the lead and a racing incident ensued, taking Wickens out of the lead, which led to Sébastien Bourdais winning the race.

In May 2018, Wickens was awarded Indianapolis 500 Rookie of the Year honors after leading two laps and finishing ninth during the race.

He came in fifth at the July 11, 2018, Iowa Corn 300 race at Iowa Speedway, his fifth finish in the top five for the season to that date, and finished the 85-lap Honda Indy Toronto race on July 15, 2018, in third place. Later in the month, Wickens again finished second at Mid-Ohio only to Rossi this time. Wickens had climbed up to 6th place in the standings.

Endurance racing 
Wickens raced in the 2020 24 Hours of Le Mans Virtual with Mahle Racing alongside DTM racer Ferdinand Zvonimir von Habsburg and sim racers Jimmy Broadbent and Kevin Rotting in the GTE Class with the Aston Martin Vantage GTE. They finished 16th in the GTE class and 45th in the overall classification

Pocono accident 
Wickens crashed violently during the 2018 ABC Supply 500 at Pocono Raceway on August 19, 2018. After a restart on lap 7, Wickens drew side by side with Ryan Hunter-Reay on the run down the back straight into turn 2. Neither driver backed out and they touched wheels, turning Hunter-Reay across the front of Wickens’ car, which as a result then launched Wickens' car over the nose of Hunter-Reay's Andretti Autosport machine and into the catchfencing. Wickens' car broke apart upon impact with the catchfence, shearing all four tires and most of the car's bodywork from its chassis, although the drivers' safety cell remained intact. The cockpit's tub then spun off of the top of the SAFER barrier and landed back on the track and slid to a stop on the straight just beyond turn 2. The crash initiated a multi-car pile up which eliminated Hunter-Reay, Wickens’ teammate James Hinchcliffe, Takuma Sato and Pietro Fittipaldi. All were checked out by the on-site medical staff and required no further immediate treatment.

The race was red flagged while Wickens was extricated from the car, with Indycar officials stating he was “awake and alert”, before being transferred to hospital by helicopter. Subsequent reports indicated that Wickens was admitted to Lehigh Valley Hospital–Cedar Crest with fractures to his legs, spine and right forearm in addition to pulmonary contusion. After an MRI scan, Wickens underwent spinal surgery to repair a thoracic spinal fracture on August 20;  titanium rods and screws were inserted in his spine. Further surgeries were completed to treat fractures in his arm and legs.  On August 31, Wickens was transferred to Indiana University Health Methodist Hospital for further surgery on his legs. On September 7, 2018, the Wickens family announced the full extent of Robert's injuries: a thoracic spinal fracture, a neck fracture, tibia and fibula fractures to both legs, fractures in both hands, a fractured right forearm, a fractured elbow, four fractured ribs, a pulmonary contusion, and an indeterminate spinal injury. While at a rehab facility in Colorado, Wickens revealed in late October he was a paraplegic as a result of the crash.

Several factors helped Wickens survive: he ducked down so his head did not hit any solid object, the cockpit did not strike the steel pole, and forces of the impact were dissipated in the destruction of the car, sparing Wickens.

Wickens' car was withdrawn from the Bommarito Automotive Group 500, while teammate James Hinchcliffe, also involved in the accident, was cleared to race. The No. 6 car did return to the track at Portland with Carlos Muñoz behind the wheel of the car. In a press release on September 6, owners Sam Schmidt and Ric Peterson said: "the 6 is his when he comes back". The second car was renumbered to 7 for the 2019 season where Marcus Ericsson drove the car.

Despite missing the final three races of the 2018 season, Wickens had already collected enough points to earn the 2018 IndyCar Rookie of the Year award.

On 21 November 2018, Wickens published a video of him walking a few steps with machine assistance during his rehab, showcasing the movement of his legs.

On 30 January 2019, Wickens published another video showing him riding a spin bike on his own and without any assistance.

On 8 July 2019, Wickens announced he would be driving the parade lap for the Honda Indy Toronto, using hand controls.

During the COVID-19 pandemic Wickens competed in the INDYCAR iRacing Challenge. He also competed in the virtual 24 hours of Le Mans

On 5 May 2021, 989 days after the accident at Pocono, Wickens drove a race car again, testing the #54 Hyundai Veloster N TCR with Bryan Herta Autosport at Mid-Ohio Sports Car Course.  Outfitted with hand controls, normally raced by paralyzed team driver Michael Johnson, Wickens wasted no time adapting to the set-up and was up to pace within a number of laps, proving his speed and ability to race again.

Return to racing

On 14 January 2022, it was announced that Wickens will compete in the 2022 Michelin Pilot Challenge with Bryan Herta Autosport. This was Wickens' first return to racing since his accident at Pocono. In his first race at Daytona, Wickens and co-driver Mark Wilkins scored a podium with a third-place finish. On 25 June 2022, Wickens and Wilkins won the TCR class of the Michelin Pilot Challenge race at Watkins Glen International, Wickens' first race victory since 2017. He then followed this up with a win at Canadian Tire Motorsport Park in the following race. At the end of the season, Wickens finished in 6th place in the Touring Car (TCR) Drivers' championship.

Racing record

Career summary

† As Wickens was a guest driver, he was ineligible to score points.

American open-wheel racing results
(key)

Atlantic Championship

IndyCar Series
(key)

Indianapolis 500

Complete Formula Renault 3.5 Series results 
(key) (Races in bold indicate pole position) (Races in italics indicate fastest lap)

Complete A1 Grand Prix results
(key) (Races in bold indicate pole position) (Races in italics indicate fastest lap)

Complete Formula 3 Euro Series results
(key)

Complete FIA Formula Two Championship results
(key) (Races in bold indicate pole position) (Races in italics indicate fastest lap)

Complete GP3 Series results
(key) (Races in bold indicate pole position) (Races in italics indicate fastest lap)

Complete Formula One participations
(key) (Races in bold indicate pole position) (Races in italics indicate fastest lap)

Complete Deutsche Tourenwagen Masters results
(key) (Races in bold indicate pole position) (Races in italics indicate fastest lap)

† Driver retired, but was classified as they completed 75% of the winner's race distance.

References

External links 

  robertwickens.com
 Robert Wickens at redbull-juniorteam.com
 Career statistic driverdb.com

1989 births
Living people
People with paraplegia
Racing drivers from Ontario
Sportspeople from Toronto
Atlantic Championship drivers
Formula Renault Eurocup drivers
Formula BMW ADAC drivers
Formula BMW USA drivers
A1 Team Canada drivers
Formula 3 Euro Series drivers
British Formula Three Championship drivers
FIA Formula Two Championship drivers
Canadian GP3 Series drivers
World Series Formula V8 3.5 drivers
Deutsche Tourenwagen Masters drivers
IndyCar Series drivers
Indianapolis 500 drivers
Indianapolis 500 Rookies of the Year
Carlin racing drivers
WeatherTech SportsCar Championship drivers
HWA Team drivers
Mercedes-AMG Motorsport drivers
Bryan Herta Autosport drivers
Starworks Motorsport drivers
Arrow McLaren SP drivers
A1 Grand Prix drivers
Mücke Motorsport drivers
Kolles Racing drivers
Signature Team drivers
EuroInternational drivers
Forsythe Racing drivers
Motopark Academy drivers
Status Grand Prix drivers
Michelin Pilot Challenge drivers